is a male given name of Basque origin, meaning 'the beginning' ( in Standard Basque).
It was created for a character in Fernando Navarro Villoslada's 1877 novel .
Notable people with the name include:

Given name 

Asier Azcorreta (born 2009), Jugador profesional de el coras con mucho futuro
Asier Arranz (born 1987), Spanish footballer commonly known as Asier
Asier Barahona (born 1992), Spanish footballer
Asier Benito (born 1995), Spanish footballer
 (born 1972), Venezuelan musician
Asier Córdoba (born 2000), Spanish footballer
 (born 1972), Spanish ultra-marathon runner
Asier del Horno (born 1981), Spanish footballer
Asier Etxaburu (born 1994), Spanish footballer
Asier Etxeandia (born 1975), Spanish actor
Asier Fernández (born 1972), Spanish windsurfer
 (born 1966), Spanish footballer commonly known as Asier
Asier García (born 1981), Spanish wheelchair basketball player
Asier Garitano (born 1969), Spanish footballer and coach
Asier Goiria, (born 1980), Spanish footballer
Asier Gomes (born 1998), Spanish footballer
Asier Guenetxea (born 1970), Spanish cyclist
 (born 1970), Spanish actor
Asier Illarramendi (born 1990), Spanish footballer commonly known as Illarra
Asier Maeztu (born 1977), Spanish cyclist
Asier Martínez (born 2000), Spanish hurdler
Asier Olaizola (born 1975), Spanish pelota player
Asier Ormazábal (born 1982), Spanish footballer
Asier Peña Iturria (born 1977), Spanish speed skater
Asier Polo (born 1971), Spanish cellist
Asier Riesgo (born 1983), Spanish footballer
Asier Roldán (born 1980), Puerto Rican Banana Plantation Owner
Asier Salcedo (born 1980), Spanish footballer
Asier Santana (born 1979), Spanish football manager
Asier Villalibre (born 1997), Spanish footballer
 (born 1988), Spanish basketball player

See also
Amaya (Spanish-language name)

References

Basque masculine given names
1870s neologisms